The Woodrow Wilson Presidential Library and Museum is a complex located in Staunton, Virginia. It contains the President's birthplace, known as the Manse, a Museum that explores the life and times of Woodrow Wilson (1856–1924), a  Research Library, a gift shop, and several other buildings that are not open to the public. Like all United States presidential libraries for administrations prior to that of Herbert Hoover, Wilson's is not part of the Federal National Archives' presidential library system.

The Birthplace Manse

The Woodrow Wilson Birthplace is referred to as the Manse, which is the name of a Presbyterian minister's home. It was built in 1846 by the Staunton First Presbyterian Church. It has 12 rooms with 12 fireplaces and cost around $4,000 to build. The Wilson family moved into the house in 1855 as his father was ordained as a Presbyterian pastor and called to serve as a pastor in Staunton.  At that time the family  consisted of his  parents—Jessie Woodrow Wilson and Joseph Ruggles Wilson—and their two daughters Marion and Annie, who were about four and two years old, respectively.  Thomas Woodrow Wilson was born in what is now called the "birth room" on December 28, 1856. The Wilsons left the Manse in 1858 when Joseph Wilson accepted a call from a congregation in Augusta, Georgia.

Wilson continued to visit Staunton throughout his life often referring to it as home. After his 1912 presidential election, Wilson and  Ellen visited Staunton over his birthday in December of that year and spent two nights in the Manse as a guest of his good friend Rev Frazier who was then the Minister at the First Presbyterian Church of Staunton. After the Wilsons moved out of the Manse it remained the Presbyterian minister's until the 1920s. It was after the former President's death in 1924 that his widow Edith Bolling Galt Wilson along with former cabinet members and Staunton community members decided to create a Birthplace museum to commemorate Wilson's life.

The Woodrow Wilson Birthplace Foundation was officially incorporated in 1938, and the house was restored to its 1850s look over the next 80 years, which included removing bathrooms, changing light fixtures, and stripping paint. The house was opened to the public in 1941, being formally dedicated as a museum by President Franklin D. Roosevelt. The property was designated a National Historic Landmark in 1964, and was added to the National Register of Historic Places in 1966.  It is located in the Gospel Hill Historic District.

The Library

The Woodrow Wilson Presidential Library houses Woodrow Wilson materials from during and immediately after his lifetime, memoirs of those who worked with him, and governmental volumes concerning World War I.  The library is located at 235 East Beverley Street in Staunton, Virginia. It boasts the third largest collection of Woodrow Wilson Papers.  Wilson's official papers are located at The Library of Congress.  Princeton University also maintains a large collection of Wilson papers from his tenure as Professor and President of the university.  The Woodrow Wilson Library focuses on the digitization all of the President's papers and other materials in order to make the papers more accessible to the general public. It is open to researchers by appointment only.

The Museum

The Museum—opened to the public in 1990—is on North Coalter street two doors down from the Manse and in front of the library. The  Museum contains eight museum galleries that focus on the life and times of Wilson.  Highlights of the museum include the president's 1919 Pierce-Arrow limousine and an interactive trench exhibit based on a World War I trench.

See also

List of National Historic Landmarks in Virginia
National Register of Historic Places listings in Staunton, Virginia
Woodrow Wilson Boyhood Home

References

External links

 Woodrow Wilson Presidential Library
"Life Portrait of Woodrow Wilson", from C-SPAN's American Presidents: Life Portraits, broadcast from the Woodrow Wilson Birthplace, September 13, 1999
Manse, Frederick & Coalter Streets, Staunton, Staunton, VA: 3 photos, 1 color transparency, 8 measured drawings, 4 data pages, and 1 photo caption page at Historic American Buildings Survey

Presidential homes in the United States
Historic house museums in Virginia
National Historic Landmarks in Virginia
Presidential libraries
Woodrow Wilson
Libraries in Virginia
Houses completed in 1846
Presidential museums in Virginia
Museums in Staunton, Virginia
Historic American Buildings Survey in Virginia
National Register of Historic Places in Staunton, Virginia
Houses on the National Register of Historic Places in Virginia
Individually listed contributing properties to historic districts on the National Register in Virginia
Houses in Staunton, Virginia
Birthplaces of individual people